This is a list of municipal schools in Shinjuku.

Public elementary and junior high schools in Shinjuku are operated by the Shinjuku City (the Shinjuku Ward) Board of Education.

Junior high schools

Junior high schools:
 Nishishinjuku Junior High School (西新宿中学校)
 Nishitoyama Junior High School (新宿西戸山中学校)
 Nishiwaseda Junior High School (西早稲田中学校)
 Ochiai Junior High School (落合中学校)
 Ochiai No. 2 Junior High School (落合第二中学校)
 Shinjuku Junior High School (新宿中学校)
 Ushigome No. 1 Junior High School (牛込第一中学校)
 Ushigome No. 2 Junior High School (牛込第二中学校)
 Ushigome No. 3 Junior High School (牛込第三中学校)
 Yotsuya Junior High School (四谷中学校)

Elementary schools

Elementary schools:
 Aijitsu Elementary School (愛日小学校)
 Edogawa Elementary School (江戸川小学校)
 Hanazono Elementary School (花園小学校)
 Higashitoyama Elementary School (東戸山小学校)
 Ichigaya Elementary School (市谷小学校)
 Kashiwagi Elementary School (柏木小学校)
 Nishi-Shinjuku Elementary School (西新宿小学校)
 Nishi-Toyama Elementary School (西戸山小学校)
 Ochiai Daiichi (No. 1) Elementary School (落合第一小学校)
 Ochiai Daini (No. 2) Elementary School (落合第二小学校)
 Ochiai Daisan (No. 3) Elementary School (落合第三小学校)
 Ochiai Daiyon (No. 4) Elementary School (落合第四小学校)
 Ochiai Daigo (No. 5) Elementary School (落合第五小学校)
 Ochiai Dairoku (No. 6) Elementary School (落合第六小学校)
 Ōkubo Elementary School (大久保小学校)
 Tenjin Elementary School (天神小学校)
 Tomihisa Elementary School (富久小学校)
 Totsuka Daiichi Elementary School (戸塚第一小学校)
 Totsuka Daini Elementary School (戸塚第二小学校)
 Totsuka Daisan Elementary School (戸塚第三小学校)
 Toyama Elementary School (戸山小学校)
 Tsukudo Elementary School (津久戸小学校)
 Tsurumaki Elementary School (鶴巻小学校)
 Ushigome-Nakano Elementary School (牛込仲之小学校)
 Tokyo City Ushigome Elementary School (東京市牛込尋常小学校) opened in 1908 (Meiji 41).
 Waseda Elementary School (早稲田小学校)
 Yochomachi Elementary School (余丁町小学校)
 Yodobashi No. 4 Elementary School (淀橋第四小学校)
 Yotsuya Elementary School (四谷小学校)
 Yotsuya Dairoku (No. 6) Elementary School (四谷第六小学校)

Former schools:
 Ushigome Haramachi Elementary School (牛込原町小学校) - Merged into Ushigome-Nakano Elementary in 1998 (Heisei 10).
 Yodobashi No. 1 Elementary School (淀橋第一小学校) - In 1997 (Heisei 9), merged into Kashiwagi Elementary School
 Yodobashi No. 2 Elementary School (淀橋第二小学校) - Closed March 31, 1986 (Showa 61) - Students moved to Yodobashi No. 6 (淀橋第六小学校)
 Yodobashi No. 3 Elementary School (淀橋第三小学校) - Merged into Nishi Shinjuku Elementary School in 1997
 Yodobashi No. 6 Elementary School (淀橋第六小学校) - Merged into Nishi Shinjuku Elementary School in 1997
 Yodobashi No. 7 Elementary School (淀橋第七小学校) - In 1997, merged into Kashiwagi Elementary School
 Yotsuya No. 1 Elementary School (四谷第一小学校) - Closed March 31, 2002 (Heisei 14) - Students moved to Yodobashi No. 3 Elementary
 Yotsuya No. 3 Elementary School (四谷第三小学校) - Merged into Yotsuya Elementary in 2007 (Heisei 19)
 Yotsuya No. 4 Elementary School (四谷第四小学校) - Merged into Yotsuya Elementary in 2007
 Yotsuya No. 5 Elementary School (四谷第五小学校) - Merged into Hanazono Elementary in 1997
 Yotsuya No. 7 Elementary School (四谷第七小学校) - Merged into Hanazono Elementary in 1997

Special schools
Special schools:
 Shinjuku School for the Handicapped (新宿養護学校)

References

Shinjuku
Shinjuku